Isaac Montrose Taylor (June 15, 1921 – November 3, 1996) was an American physician and academic who served as dean of the Medical School of the University of North Carolina from 1964 until 1971.  His first marriage to Gertrude Woodard produced five children who all became professional musicians: Alex (1947), James (1948), Kate (1949), Livingston (1950), and Hugh (1952). Through his second marriage to Suzanne Francis Sheats, he fathered three more children: Andrew Preston (1983), Theodore Haynes (1986), and Julia Rose (1989).

Taylor was born in Morganton, North Carolina. He received his undergraduate degree from the University of North Carolina at Chapel Hill and his doctor of medicine from Harvard University. He served as the chief resident at Massachusetts General Hospital. He then joined the faculty of the University of North Carolina Medical School before serving as dean for ten years.

In 1955, he joined the United States Navy and became a medical officer. In 1957, he was a lieutenant commander and was a bacteriologist at McMurdo Station in Antarctica for Operation Deep Freeze.

See also
Charles H. Taylor (publisher)
John I. Taylor

References

External links
UNC School of Medicine History. It summarizes Taylor and his deanship as follows.
The Papers of Isaac M. Taylor at Dartmouth College Library

1921 births
1996 deaths
American bacteriologists
Harvard Medical School alumni
People from Morganton, North Carolina
Taylor family (show business)
United States Navy Medical Corps officers
University of North Carolina at Chapel Hill alumni
University of North Carolina School of Medicine faculty
20th-century American physicians